Ricardo Matias Héber (28 September 1927 – 14 August 2002) was an Argentine javelin thrower who competed in the 1948 Summer Olympics and in the 1952 Summer Olympics. He placed first in the 1951 Pan American Games javelin throw and second in the 1955 Pan American Games javelin throw.

References

1927 births
2002 deaths
Athletes from Buenos Aires
Argentine male javelin throwers
Olympic athletes of Argentina
Athletes (track and field) at the 1948 Summer Olympics
Athletes (track and field) at the 1952 Summer Olympics
Pan American Games gold medalists for Argentina
Pan American Games silver medalists for Argentina
Athletes (track and field) at the 1951 Pan American Games
Athletes (track and field) at the 1955 Pan American Games
Athletes (track and field) at the 1963 Pan American Games
Pan American Games medalists in athletics (track and field)
Medalists at the 1951 Pan American Games
Medalists at the 1955 Pan American Games
20th-century Argentine people
21st-century Argentine people